Jenny Spangler (born July 20, 1963) is an American long-distance runner. She competed in Atlanta, GA in the women's marathon at the 1996 Summer Olympics, but dropped out, along with 20 other women. By virtue of winning the Olympic Trials in 2:29:54, she was also the 1996 United States National Champion in the Marathon. She had run the best time of any U.S. Junior in 1983, clocking 2:33:52 at the Duluth, Minnesota point-to-point Grandma's Marathon. In 1984, she finished the Trials in 2:40:18, in 1988, 2:44.59, and in 2000, in 2:36:30, for 9th place.

References

External links
 

1963 births
Living people
Athletes (track and field) at the 1996 Summer Olympics
American female long-distance runners
American female marathon runners
Olympic track and field athletes of the United States
Sportspeople from Rockford, Illinois
20th-century American women